Adjutant Auguste Baux (9 July 1892 – 17 July 1918) was a French World War I flying ace credited with five aerial victories.

Biography

Baux first served in the infantry, and on 3 October 1914 during the fighting on the Western Front was taken prisoner by the Germans. However he managed to escape and returned to the French lines.

He later transferred to the Army's aviation service, gaining Military Pilot's Certificate No. 5484, and was then posted to Escadrille N 103 on 4 May 1917, flying Nieuports. The unit was renamed Escadrille SPA 103 in April 1917, after re-equipping with SPAD aircraft.

Baux's first confirmed aerial victory came on 16 March 1918 after shooting down an Albatros D.V fighter over Witry-lès-Reims. On 22 March he and two other pilots were jointly credited with shooting down a Rumpler two-seater reconnaissance aircraft over Rilly-la-Montagne. On 22 April Baux and Sgt Gilbert Loup claimed two fighters shot down over Laval, but their claims were denied. On 2 June his victory over an enemy aircraft over Moreuil was confirmed, and he gained two more confirmed victories (though details remain obscure) before his death in combat over Cuchery on 17 July 1918.

Baux was awarded the Military Medal and the Croix de Guerre with four palms.

References

Further reading
 

1892 births
1918 deaths
People from Drôme
French Army soldiers
World War I prisoners of war held by Germany
French World War I flying aces
French military personnel killed in World War I
Recipients of the Croix de Guerre 1914–1918 (France)